Wyoming Highway 238 (WYO 238) is a  Wyoming state road located in north-central Lincoln County, Wyoming.

Route description
Wyoming Highway 238 begins its southern end at U.S. Route 89 (Washington Street) in Afton. WYO 238 travels west, passing north of the Afton Municipal Airport, as this stretch of WYO 238 runs east-west. After leaving Afton WYO 238 turns north, at approximately 3.2 miles. Now due north, Highway 238 reaches Wyoming Highway 237 in Auburn at just over 8 miles. Highway 237 provides access between US 89 and Auburn. WYO 238 continues northward before gently turning northeasterly and intersecting US 89 at its northern terminus south of Bedford.

Major intersections

References

External links 

Wyoming State Routes
WYO 238 - US 89 to WYO 237
WYO 238 - WYO 237 to US 89

Transportation in Lincoln County, Wyoming
238